A cowgirl is the female equivalent of a cowboy.

Cowgirl or Cowgirls may also refer to:

Arts and entertainment
 Cowgirl (album), a 2006 album by Lynn Anderson
 "Cowgirl" (song), a 1994 single by Underworld
 "Cowgirls", a 2004 song by Kerry Harvick from the unreleased album Cowgirls
 Cowgirl, a German film starring Alexandra Maria Lara
 Cowgirl, a short film featuring Sandra Oh
 Jillian "Cowgirl" Pearlman, a character in the Green Lantern comics featuring Hal Jordan
 Cowgirl, a character in the comic book mini-series Ultra

Sports
 Hardin-Simmons Cowgirls, the women's athletic teams of Hardin-Simmons University, a private Baptist university in Abilene, Texas
 McNeese State Cowgirls, the women's athletic teams of McNeese State University, Lake Charles, Louisiana
 Oklahoma State Cowgirls, the women's athletic teams of Oklahoma State University–Stillwater
 Cowgirl Stadium, a softball facility
 Wyoming Cowgirls, the women's athletic teams of the University of Wyoming
 A derisive nickname for the Dallas Cowboys, used by rival fans

Other uses
 Cowgirl (sex position), another name for the "woman on top" position
 Cowgirl Creamery, an artisanal cheese company in California, US